Parcani may refer to:

Parcani, Prozor, a village in Bosnia and Herzegovina
Parcani, Şoldăneşti, a commune in Moldova
Parcani, Soroca, a commune in Moldova
Parcani, Transnistria, a commune in Moldova
Parcani, a village in Răciula Commune, Călăraşi district, Moldova
Parcani (Sopot), a village in Belgrade, Serbia